John Nommensen Duchac (born February 25, 1953), known professionally as John Doe, is an American singer, songwriter, actor, poet, guitarist and bass player. Doe co-founded LA punk band X, of which he is still an active member. His musical performances and compositions span rock, punk, country and folk music genres. As an actor, he has dozens of television appearances and several movies to his credit, including the role of Jeff Parker in the television series Roswell.

In addition to X, Doe performs with the country-folk-punk band the Knitters and has released records as a solo artist. In the early 1980s, he performed on two albums by the Flesh Eaters.

Career

Music 
Doe moved to Los Angeles, California, and in 1976 met guitar player Billy Zoom through an ad in the local free weekly paper, The Recycler.

As a musician with X, Doe has two feature-length concert films, several music videos, and an extended performance-and-interview sequence in The Decline of Western Civilization, Penelope Spheeris's seminal documentary about the early-1980s L.A. punk scene.

Along with co-writer Exene Cervenka, Doe composed most of the songs recorded by X. Wild Gift, an album from that band's heyday, was named "Record of the Year" by Rolling Stone, The Los Angeles Times, and The New York Times. With Dave Alvin, he co-wrote two of the songs on the Blasters' 1984 album Hard Line, "Just Another Sunday" and "Little Honey". He also wrote "Cyrano de Berger's Back" for the Flesh Eaters LP A Minute to Pray, a Second To Die.

Since 1990, Doe has recorded nearly a dozen albums as a soloist or in collaboration with other artists, and has contributed tracks to motion pictures.  In the 1992 movie The Bodyguard (starring Kevin Costner and Whitney Houston), it is Doe's version of "I Will Always Love You" that plays on the jukebox when Costner's and Houston's characters are dancing. It was released on audio cassette by Warner Bros. in September 1992, but no version is believed to exist on CD. He co-wrote and played on the song "Lobotomy" with Tyler Willman for the eponymous 1998 debut studio album of the band Calm Down Juanita.

Doe took part in Todd Haynes's 2007 movie I'm Not There, recording two Bob Dylan covers, "Pressing On" and "I Dreamed I Saw St. Augustine." Both recordings were included on the film's soundtrack, and the former was prominently featured in the film, with Christian Bale (as Pastor John Rollins) lip-synching Doe's vocals. Doe recorded the song "Unforgiven" in 2007 with Aimee Mann on A Year in the Wilderness, an album which also featured Kathleen Edwards, Jill Sobule, Dan Auerbach. He then joined with Eddie Vedder on a mix of the song "Golden State" in 2008. "The Meanest Man in the World" by Doe was featured in Season 4 of the television series Friday Night Lights and included on the second soundtrack album. Country Club (2009), featuring Canadian indie rock band The Sadies, covered country classics along with original songs.

Doe contributed a cover of "Peggy Sue Got Married" to the 2011 tribute album Rave on Buddy Holly.

His latest solo record, The Westerner, was released in 2016. Doe said that it was made in the desert, in Arizona, and that the genre is psychedelic soul.

Acting 
In the 1989 biographical film Great Balls of Fire!, Doe played Jerry Lee Lewis's cousin-turned-father-in-law J. W. Brown.  He starred in the 1992 films Roadside Prophets and Pure Country, and in the 1998 short Lone Greasers. Other movie acting credits include Road House, Vanishing Point, Salvador, Boogie Nights, The Specials, The Good Girl, Gypsy 83, Wyatt Earp, Border Radio, Pure Country, The Outsiders, and Brokedown Palace. Doe has appeared on the television series Law & Order, Roswell, Carnivale, One Tree Hill, Childrens Hospital (alongside his fellow bandmates in X) and The Wizards of Waverly Place.

Author
With co-author Tom DeSavia, Doe wrote and compiled stories for a book about the LA punk rock scene from 1977 to 1983. The book, Under the Big Black Sun, incorporated the punk ethos of contributions from other musicians that were part of the scene, people like Exene Cervenka, Jack Grisham, Henry Rollins, Mike Watt, Jane Wiedlin and others who wrote chapters. Doe wanted it to be a collective recollection, not just one person's perspective of the time.

A sequel of sorts was released in 2019 entitled More Fun in the New World: The Unmaking and Legacy of L.A. Punk. Doe and DeSavia again invited contributors to narrate the space of time from 1982 to 1987.

Personal life
Doe was born in Decatur, Illinois. He was married to fellow X member Exene Cervenka between 1980 and 1985. He remarried in 1987. He revealed to Adam Carolla in a podcast in September 2011 that he resided (at the time) in Fairfax, California. He has three daughters. In early 2017, he announced that he would be moving to Austin, Texas.

Discography

Filmography

The Decline of Western Civilization (1981)
Legends Of The Spanish Kitchen (1985)
X: The Unheard Music (1986)
Salvador (1986)
Slam Dance (1987)
Border Radio (1987)
Road House (1989)
Great Balls of Fire! (1989)
Liquid Dreams (1991)
A Matter of Degrees (1991)
Roadside Prophets (1992)
Pure Country (1992)
Wyatt Earp (1994)
Shake, Rattle and Rock! (1994)
Georgia (1995)
Scorpion Spring (1996)
Black Circle Boys (1997)
Vanishing Point (1997)
Touch (1997)
Party of Five (1997) 1 Episode
The Price of Kissing (1997)
The Last Time I Committed Suicide (1997)
Boogie Nights (1997)
Get to the Heart: The Barbara Mandrell Story (1997)
Lone Greasers (1998)
The Pass (1998)
Black Cat Run (1998)
Odd Man (1998)
Drowning on Dry Land (1999)
Veronica's Closet  (1999) 1 Episode
Sugar Town (1999)
Knocking on Deaths Door (1999)
The Rage: Carrie 2 (1999)
Forces of Nature (1999)
Wildflowers (1999)
Brokedown Palace (1999)
Martial Law (1999) 1 Episode
The Strip (1999) 1 Episode
The Specials (2000)
ER (2000) 1 Episode
Gypsy 83 (2001)
Jon Good's Wife (2001)
Employee of the Month (2002)
The Good Girl (2002)
Bug (2002)
Roswell (1999–2002) 18 Episodes
Fastlane (2002) 1 Episode
Red Zone (2002)
Wuthering Heights (2003)
Peacemakers (2003) 1 Episode
Law & Order (2003) 1 Episode
Carnivàle (2003) 2 Episodes
Torque (2004)
Tom 51 (2004)
We Jam Econo (2005)
Lucky 13 (2005)
X – Live in Los Angeles (2005)
CSI: Miami (2005) 1 Episode
The Darwin Awards (2006)
Jammin (2006) 1 EpisodeTen Inch Hero (2007)The Sandpiper (2007)Man Maid (2008)Absent Father (2008)One Tree Hill (2008)Wizards of Waverly Place (2009) 1 EpisodePleased to Meet Me (2013)Childrens Hospital (2016) 1 episodeAll Creatures Here Below'' (2018)

References

External links

John Doe – What Would John Doe Do? Blog 

1953 births
20th-century American male musicians
20th-century American bass guitarists
Living people
American punk rock bass guitarists
American punk rock singers
X (American band) members
The Knitters members
American male film actors
American male television actors
Writers from Decatur, Illinois
Singers from California
Male actors from California
People from Fairfax, California
Musicians from Decatur, Illinois
Guitarists from California
Guitarists from Illinois
American male bass guitarists
The Flesh Eaters members
SpinART Records artists
Yep Roc Records artists